The 1969 Georgia Tech Yellow Jackets football team represented the Georgia Institute of Technology in the 1969 NCAA University Division football season. The Yellow Jackets were led by third-year head coach Bud Carson and played their home games at Grant Field  in Atlanta.

Schedule

References

Georgia Tech
Georgia Tech Yellow Jackets football seasons
Georgia Tech Yellow Jackets football